Bahadur Shah Park,  formerly known as Victoria Park, is a park located in Old Dhaka, Bangladesh. It has a memorial dedicated to the soldiers killed by the British in the aftermath of the Indian Mutiny of 1857. It was built in 1858 at the initiative of Nawab Khwaja Abdul Ghani, in the Sadarghat area. It was named Victoria Park until 1947. After that, it was renamed after Bahadur Shah II, the last Mughal emperor.

History
In the late nineteenth century Bahadur Shah Park was the centre of Dhaka with European style architecture with several civic and religious buildings and educational institutions around it. During the eighteenth century, the European started a club for them. They used to play different games, among other games, billiard, and hence the premise was called  'Anta Gharer Maidan' . The English later demolished it and created a round-about park facing the St Thomas church. The club was shifted elsewhere which later became the famous Dhaka club. The park became a major node in the road network of old Dhaka. At that time, it had all important buildings and establishments around it, many of which are gone now. It is where the mutineers of the failed 1857 Revolt ('Sipahi mutiny for freedom fight') were publicly executed by hanging. It was also the scene from where accession by Queen Victoria and India was announced amidst much fanfare in 1858, and hence the original name of 'Victoria Park' bestowed. After Partition, the park was renamed 'Bahadur Shah Park' after the last emperor of Mughal India.

In a stone throw distance around the park, important institutional buildings such as court, Bank, DC's office and Jagannath college which is now a public university are situated.

Architectural significance
Bahadur Shah Park is enriched with some architectural displays. It has two entrances. Plenty of tall trees really make the place majestic. The sculptures in the park are one of a kind. There is Dhaka's only Obelisk which commemorates the death of Dhaka Nawab's son. There is another magnificent sculpture at the western part. It was built in the honour of the martyrs. There is also an octagonal fountain in the middle of a star shaped fountain in the park. Bahadur Shah Park now attracts the young and the old, who come here to enjoy the peaceful environment. Whether you are interested in the history of Bangladesh or are simply looking for a place to take a relaxing stroll, Bahadur Shah Park is a delightful attraction in Dhaka.

Today

The towering monument of the park in the city is now losing its glory as most of its historic infrastructures are in dilapidated condition due to negligence, even the boundary wall has collapsed. Unscrupulous persons have occupied its land and parts of the footpath illegally to set up shops and other business. The park now somehow maintains its existence with no initiative to preserve the heritage. Under the circumstances, the DCC initiative is a good step to save the heritage site. The condition of the area is now terrible. People using the park's footpath very often fall victim to many incidents. Toll collectors and vagabonds are dominating the area and are indulging in snatching which is on the rise. Historical Bahadur Shah Park (Victoria Park) lost all its importance and glamour. Witness to many historic events and once a traditional place for sojourn have lost all its past glamour. Moreover, water from the only big artificial waterfall of the park could not be drained. It is very unfortunate that the last relic of the Mughal Empire is now in very poor condition which demands immediate attention from the government of Bangladesh.

Activities

There are many educational institutions around the park. These are Jagannath University, Shaheed Suhrawardy College, Kabi Nazrul College, City Corporation Mohila College, Government Muslim High School,  and Sunflower High School, among many others. At daytime, students of these institutions gather and gossip in the park and many health-conscious people come to the park for jogging and walking in the morning and in the afternoon. The park provides a good opportunity to its visitors to look back at the turbulent history of the nation. The park attracts some two thousand visitors each day and frequently sets the scene for cultural and religious festivals.

References

Bibliography
 Talukdar, Abdul Wahed. Ei Banglay ei jonopode. Dhaka: Angels Place and Publications, 
 Rahman, Shafiqur. Bangladesh Vromon guide. Dhaka: Hera Printers, 
 Dani, Ahmad Hasan. Dhaka A record of its changing fortunes, Dhaka, Bangladesh: Asiatic Society of Bangladesh, 2009
 Karim, Abdul. Banglar Itihas – Mughal Amal, 
 "News From Bangladesh – Daily news monitoring service". http://www.bangladesh-web.com/view.php?hidRecord=48933 (16 April 2011).
 Dr. Rahman, Mahbubur. "An Architect's Dhaka" Star Campus. http://archive.thedailystar.net/campus/2009/01/01/feature_dhaka.htm (16 April 2011)
 Mamun, Muntasir. Dhaka Smriti Bismritir nogori. Dhaka, Bangladesh. 1993. 9844121043

Old Dhaka
Parks in Dhaka
Parks established in 1857
1857 establishments in British India
Monuments and memorials in Dhaka